Greater Media, Inc., known as Greater Media, was an American media company that specialized in radio stations.  The markets where they owned radio stations included Boston, Detroit, Philadelphia, Charlotte, and the state of New Jersey.  The company was formed in 1956 in Southbridge, Massachusetts, and its headquarters were located in Braintree, Massachusetts.

Greater Media also published several weekly newspapers in Central New Jersey. The newspaper group won 12 Suburban Newspapers of America awards for 2006.

On November 12, 2007, Greater Media announced it was buying three stations in Charlotte, North Carolina from Lincoln Financial Media--WBT, WBT-FM, and WLNK. The deal was finalized on January 31, 2008.

On July 19, 2016, Beasley Broadcast Group announced that it would acquire Greater Media's radio stations for $240 million. The FCC approved the sale on October 6, and the sale closed on October 29. The Greater Media newspapers were sold to the Newspaper Media Group.

List of radio stations

Boston
WROR-FM 105.7 FM — Classic Hits
WKLB-FM 102.5 FM — Country
WBQT 96.9 FM — Rhythmic AC
WMJX 106.7 FM — Adult Contemporary
WBOS 92.9 FM — Modern Rock

Detroit
WCSX 94.7 FM — Classic Rock
WMGC-FM 105.1 FM — Classic Hip Hop
WRIF 101.1 FM — Active Rock

New Jersey
WMGQ 98.3 FM — Adult Contemporary, New Brunswick
WCTC 1450 AM — Talk, New Brunswick
WDHA-FM 105.5 FM — Rock, Dover
WMTR 1250 AM —Oldies; Morristown
WRAT 95.9 FM — Rock, Point Pleasant
WJRZ-FM 100.1 FM — Adult Contemporary, Manahawkin

Philadelphia
WPEN 97.5 FM —  Sports
WMGK 102.9 FM — Classic Rock
WMMR 93.3 FM — Rock
WBEN-FM 95.7 FM — Adult Hits

Charlotte
WLNK 107.9 FM — Adult Contemporary
WBT 1110 AM — News/Talk
WBT-FM 99.3 FM — News/Talk (simulcast of WBT)

List of publications
Names in parentheses are the markets they serve, all of which are in New Jersey.
Atlanticville (Eatontown, Long Branch, Monmouth Beach, Ocean Township, West Long Branch)
the hub (Fair Haven, Little Silver, Oceanport, Red Bank, Rumson, Sea Bright, Shrewsbury, Tinton Falls)
Examiner (Allentown, Millstone, Roosevelt, Upper Freehold)
Independent (Aberdeen, Hazlet, Holmdel, Keyport, Matawan, Middletown)
News Transcript (Colts Neck, Englishtown, Freehold, Manalapan, Marlboro)
Tri-Town News (Howell, Jackson, Lakewood, Plumsted)
Edison/Metuchen Sentinel (Edison, Metuchen)
North/South Brunswick Sentinel (North Brunswick, South Brunswick)
East Brunswick Sentinel (East Brunswick, Helmetta, Jamesburg, Milltown, Monroe, South River, Spotswood)
Suburban (Old Bridge, Sayreville)

References

External links
Greater Media Website
Greater Media newspapers portal

Companies based in Braintree, Massachusetts
Mass media in New Jersey
1956 establishments in Massachusetts
2016 disestablishments in Massachusetts
Defunct radio broadcasting companies of the United States
Mass media companies disestablished in 2016